The women's road race was one of 18 cycling events of the 2016 Olympic Games in Rio de Janeiro. The event was held on 7 August 2016 at Fort Copacabana and was won by Anna van der Breggen from the Netherlands.

Qualification

Course 
Starting at Fort Copacabana, the peloton headed west to pass through Ipanema, Barra, and Reserva Maripendi Beaches via the coastal road leading to the  Pontal / Grumari circuit loop. After two laps of the Grumari sector , the course returned east via the same coastal road to enter the Vista Chinesa Circuit loop at Gávea for one lap of the  circuit before finishing back at Fort Copacabana. As with all road races during the Olympic Games, law enforcement escorted the athletes to keep them and bystanders safe during the competition. The Brazilian Federal Highway Police (PRF) were assigned the duty to escort the athletes during the 2016 Olympics.

Start list

The following NOCs had qualified riders to compete in the road race event. The following riders were confirmed by their respective NOCs.

* ref:

Over time limit (OTL)
Under UCI regulations for one-day road races (article 2.3.039), "Any rider finishing in a time exceeding that of the winner by more than 5% shall not be placed".

Result

References

Women's road race
Women's road race
Cycling at the Summer Olympics – Women's road race
Women's events at the 2016 Summer Olympics